Tissiflashmob (Finnish for "tits flash mob") was a demonstration organised by Sandra Marins and Säde Vallarén, which was held for the first time in June 2019 at the Hietaniemi beach in Helsinki, Finland. The organisers held the demonstration in criticism for a previous event where a woman had been removed from a beach for sunbathing topless.

The demonstration was held for a second time in 2020 in eight different cities and also online. This time the demonstration was held by the feminist activist group Cult Cunth.

References

Demonstrations
Nudity
Feminist protests